The Hils is a range of hills in Germany's Central Uplands that is up to 480.4 m high. It is located in the districts of Holzminden, Hildesheim and Northeim, in the state of Lower Saxony.

Geography 

The heavily forested massif of the Hils, which is part of the Leine Uplands and Weser-Leine Uplands, is immediately southeast of the knife edge ridge known as the Ith. It is located roughly northwest of Einbeck between Holzen to the west and Delligsen to the east.

The highest elevation in the Hils is the 480.4 m high Bloße Zelle, the second highest the nearby  Großer Sohl (472 m), on which a monument to the poet, Wilhelm Raabe, has been erected next to the Wilhelm Raabe Tower named after him.

Numerous walking trails run through the Hils, which is accessible from the B 3, B 64 and B 240 federal highways.

Towns and villages in and around the Hils 

The towns and villages which lie immediately in and around the Hils are:

Coppengrave, Delligsen, Duingen, Eschershausen, Fölziehausen, Grünenplan, Hohenbüchen, Hohe Warte, Holzen, Kaierde, Varrigsen.

Central Uplands
Regions of Lower Saxony
Hill ranges of Lower Saxony
Natural regions of the Weser-Leine Uplands